Paul Flynn or Flinn may refer to:
Paul Flynn (Gaelic footballer) (born 1986), Dublin Gaelic footballer
Paul Flynn (Waterford hurler) (born 1974), Irish hurler
Paul Flynn (Tipperary hurler) (fl. 2017), Irish hurler
Paul Flynn (politician) (1935–2019), British Labour Party MP for Newport West
Paul Flinn (American football), born 1895, American football player

See also
 Paul O'Flynn (disambiguation)